The Heath is Green is a 1972 German drama film directed by Harald Reinl and starring Roy Black, Monika Lundi and Peter Millowitsch. Three friends take their holiday at a remote house in the middle of a heath, but soon grow bored of it and go out looking for excitement. It is not a remake of the 1951 film The Heath Is Green, but is also based on the motifes by Hermann Löns. Some of his poems were turned into songs in this movie.

Cast
Roy Black as Norbert
Monika Lundi as Ursula
Peter Millowitsch as Möps
Jutta Speidel as Hanna Engelmann
Rainer Rudolph as Bernie
Viktoria Brams as Anita
Heidi Kabel as Frau Engelmann
Henry Vahl as Opa
Jean-Claude Hoffmann as Stefan
Günther Schramm as Dr. Velten

References

External links

1970s musical comedy films
German musical comedy films
West German films
Films directed by Harald Reinl
Remakes of German films
Constantin Film films
1970s German-language films
1970s German films